Bengeo Rural is a civil parish in the East Hertfordshire district of Hertfordshire, England.  According to the 2001 census it had a population of 601, increasing at the 2011 Census to 644.    The parish includes the villages of Tonwell and Chapmore End.

It originated as a split of the Bengeo parish in 1894 under the provisions of the Local Government Act, the remainder of which was amalgamated with Hertford Town Council.

References

External links

 B.R.P.C. Website

Civil parishes in Hertfordshire
East Hertfordshire District